Osmorhiza occidentalis is a species of flowering plant in the family Apiaceae known by the common name western sweet cicely or western sweetroot.

It is native to western North America, including the Northwestern United States and California.

Description

The green leaves have blades up to 20 centimeters long which are divided into toothed and irregularly cut leaflets. The blade is borne on a long petiole.

The inflorescence is a compound umbel of many tiny yellowish flowers at the tip of a stemlike peduncle. The fruit is elongated and narrow, up to 2.2 centimeters long.

Uses
Many Native American groups used this plant for a great variety of medicinal purposes.

References

External links

Jepson Manual Treatment of Osmorhiza occidentalis
USDA Plants Profile for Osmorhiza occidentalis
Osmorhiza occidentalis U.C. Photo gallery

occidentalis
Flora of Western Canada
Flora of the Northwestern United States
Flora of California
Flora without expected TNC conservation status